Olav Kjørven (born 18 December 1963) is a Norwegian UN official and politician for the Christian Democratic Party.

He currently serves as Chief Strategy Officer at EAT Foundation. Before that he served as UNICEF's Director for Public Partnerships until July 2017. Previously, he was Assistant Secretary-General and Director of Bureau for Development Policy at United Nations Development Programme in New York. He started this position in February 2007.  He leads the effort to accelerate progress toward the Millennium Development Goals and to prepare for post-2015 agenda. He is also senior adviser to the UN Secretary General on sustainable energy initiative.

Before joining the United Nations, Kjørven served as a State Secretary for international development in the Ministry of Foreign Affairs between 2001 and 2005. In this capacity, he was responsible for policy making and the overall management of Norwegian international development activities. Between 1997 and 2000, he was political adviser to the Minister on International Development and Human Rights.

Kjørven served as Director of International Development at the Centre for Economic Analysis from 2000 to 2001. He also worked for the World Bank as Environmental Specialist from 1992 to 1997. He obtained his Master of Arts in international affairs from George Washington University's Elliott School of International Affairs.

References

1963 births
Living people
Elliott School of International Affairs alumni
Norwegian expatriates in the United States
United Nations Development Programme officials
Christian Democratic Party (Norway) politicians
Norwegian state secretaries
Norwegian officials of the United Nations
UNICEF people